Bruce Dale Broussard is chief executive officer and president of Humana, a health insurance company with headquarters in Louisville, Kentucky.

Background
Broussard received a degree in business from Texas A&M University and a Master of Business Administration from the University of Houston. He is a certified public accountant. He has spent his career in the health-care field. Beginning in 1990 he was vice president and treasurer for Continental Medical Systems. Three years later he became chief financial officer at Sun Healthcare Group. During the next year he was chief financial officer and executive vice president at Regency Health Services. From 1997 to 2000 he was chief executive officer of Harbor Dental.

In 2000 Broussard began working for US Oncology, which was acquired by the McKesson Corporation in 2010. For six years, he served as the company's chief financial officer. He became president in 2005 and was head of investor relations. He was also in charge of pharmaceutical services, pharmaceutical distribution, marketing and growth initiatives. He became chief executive officer of US Oncology in 2008, and chairman of the board a year later. In 2013, he became president and CEO of Humana.

Compensation
In 2016, Broussard's base salary was $1.24 million. His total compensation for the same year was $19.7 million, up from $10.3 million in 2015.

References

External links
 Appearances on C-Span

American businesspeople
Living people
Year of birth missing (living people)